Trinidad and Tobago–Turkey relations are the bilateral relations between Trinidad and Tobago and Turkey. 

Relations between Turkey and Trinidad and Tobago have been friendly but stagnant due to geographical distance. Nevertheless they have gained a fresh momentum with Turkey’s outreach policy towards the Latin American and Caribbean region initiated in 1998 and revised in 2006.

Turkey has an embassy in Port of Spain since 2018.

Official visits

Economic relations

Trade volume between the two countries was 120.8 million USD in 2019 (Turkish exports/imports: 68.4/52.4 million USD).

See also 
 Foreign relations of Trinidad and Tobago
 Foreign relations of Turkey

References 

 
Turkey
Bilateral relations of Turkey